Aniculus maximus, the "hairy yellow hermit crab" or "large hairy hermit crab", is an aquatic hermit crab of the family Calcinidae.

Description
Their colour ranges from intense red to golden yellow. They have yellow hairy legs. Their shield is marked with a series of furrows.

Diet
They are omnivores eating both algae and fishes. They may opportunistically prey on helpless organisms.

Distributed
They are found in the Indo-Pacific region.

Use in aquariums
They may be used as aquarium cleaning crabs and may be used to check algae growth, but they may attack tank mates and reefs.

References

Hermit crabs
Crustaceans described in 1952